Pilisjászfalu is a village in Pest county, Budapest metropolitan area, Hungary. It has a population of 1,396 (2007).

References

Populated places in Pest County